Ernest Thorwald Johnson Jr. (born August 7, 1956) is an American sportscaster for Turner Sports. Johnson is currently the television voice and a studio host for Major League Baseball on TBS, hosts Inside the NBA for TNT, and NBA TV and contributes to the joint coverage of the NCAA Division I men's basketball tournament for Turner and CBS Sports. His father was Ernie Johnson Sr., a Major League Baseball pitcher and Atlanta Braves play-by-play announcer.

Early life 
Johnson was born in 1956 in Milwaukee, Wisconsin. His father, Ernie Johnson Sr. (1924–2011), was a Major League Baseball player who later became a television sports commentator. Johnson's family moved to Atlanta, Georgia, after his father's retirement from professional baseball in 1964 when Ernie was eight years old.

Johnson attended high school at the Marist School, a private Catholic school in Brookhaven, Georgia, and graduated in 1974.  He then went to the University of Georgia and majored in journalism. Johnson played first base on the Bulldogs baseball team his freshman year. He graduated from Georgia in 1978 with a Bachelor of Arts, summa cum laude.

Career 
During college, Johnson got his first sportscasting job as the news and sports director for the radio station WAGQ-FM in Athens, Georgia.

In 1979, Johnson was hired as a news anchor at WMAZ-TV in Macon, Georgia. He worked there as a news anchor until 1981, when he worked as a news reporter in Spartanburg, South Carolina, at WSPA-TV. Johnson worked in Atlanta at WSB-TV as a general assignment news reporter in 1982. He became the station's weekend sports anchor and reporter in 1983. He held those jobs until 1989, when he left to join Turner Sports.

From 1993 to 1996, Johnson called Atlanta Braves baseball games for SportSouth (now Bally Sports South) with his father, Ernie Johnson Sr.

Turner Sports

NBA on TNT 

Known as "E.J.", Johnson works as the studio host for TNT's coverage of the NBA, including pregame and halftime shows, and the network's famous postgame studio show that airs after each NBA doubleheader, Inside the NBA. He has hosted the show since 1990.

At the end of each broadcast, Ernie presents "E.J.'s Neat-O Stat of the Night", which has become a popular part of the show but is sponsored by no one, hence the sign that says "Your logo here". This changed in May 2007 when vitaminwater stepped in as a sponsor for the segment, replaced by Panasonic's Viera line of televisions for 2008. For the 2005–2006 season, his segments were sponsored by Intel Centrino and most recently Suzuki. In the 2008 NBA Playoffs, his segments were presented by Geico and vitaminwater.

For all NBA-related shows, Johnson is joined by former NBA stars Kenny Smith, Charles Barkley, Shaquille O'Neal and, on occasion, Chris Webber, Grant Hill, or Reggie Miller. In the 2012–2013 regular season he was joined by Anfernee "Penny" Hardaway and Dennis Scott while Smith and Barkley covered March Madness on CBS.

Johnson is also the host of Tuesday Fan Night on sister station NBA TV, alongside Webber and Greg Anthony.  He is also the host and moderator of NBA TV's Open Court, a basketball-panel show featuring Johnson and a rotation of six panelists (all of whom are made up of TNT's NBA analysts) discussing various topics, ranging from the history of the NBA to the current day scene of the league.

In October 2022, Johnson signed a long-term contract extension with Warner Bros. Discovery Sports to continue as a host on Inside the NBA.

Non-NBA assignments 

In addition to working basketball, Johnson is also the play-by-play announcer for TNT's PGA Tour coverage. At TBS, Johnson worked as the studio host for their coverage of college football. In 2002, Johnson was co-winner of the Sports Emmy for Outstanding Sports Personality, Studio Host, tying with Bob Costas of NBC and HBO. It was the first time Johnson had been nominated for a Sports Emmy. In 2006, Johnson won the award again, this time on his own, snapping Costas's six-year stranglehold on it, including the year the two shared the honor. From 2007 to 2009, Johnson worked as the studio host alongside Cal Ripken Jr. for TBS's coverage of Major League Baseball. In 2010, he moved into a play-by-play role for the network, serving as the lead broadcaster for TBS's playoff coverage, including the 2010 ALCS. He also broadcast 40 Atlanta Braves games on sister channel Peachtree TV. In 2020, Johnson moved back into a studio host for the network's pregame and postgame show while continuing his play-by-play role for TBS's coverage of Major League Baseball.

Johnson's past work at TNT included roles as studio host for The Championships, Wimbledon, from 2000 to 2002, studio host for its National Football League coverage from 1990 to 1997, and various duties at the 1994, 1998, and 2001 Goodwill Games, as well as the 1992 Winter Olympics in Albertville, France, and the 1994 Winter Olympics in Lillehammer. He was the studio host for TNT's coverage of the 1990 FIFA World Cup. He also co-hosted Barkley's now-defunct talk show, Listen Up! Past work at TBS also included working as studio host for their NBA coverage. Johnson also called weightlifting for NBC's coverage of the 2000 Summer Olympics in Sydney. He also serves as a studio host for the NCAA tournament for CBS and Turner Sports alternating with Greg Gumbel.

In 2015, Johnson won his third Sports Emmy for Best Studio Host, and gave his award to the daughters of the late Stuart Scott, who died in January 2015.

Johnson is also a sportscaster on NBA Live 98, NBA 2K15, NBA 2K16, NBA 2K17, NBA 2K18, NBA 2K19, NBA 2K20 and NBA 2K21.

Career timeline 
1977–1989: various local news outlets (WAGQ-FM, WMAZ-TV, WSPA-TV, WSB-TV) – sports/news anchor and reporter
1989–present: Inside the NBA – lead studio host
1990: 1990 FIFA World Cup on TNT – lead studio host
1992: 1992 Winter Olympics on CBS/TNT – speed skating play-by-play
1993–1996: Atlanta Braves on SportsSouth – play-by-play
1994: 1994 Winter Olympics on CBS/TNT – speed skating play-by-play
2002–2020: Golf on TNT – lead play-by-play
2002–2006: College Football on TBS – lead studio host
2006–2010, 2020-present: MLB on TBS – studio host
2010–present: MLB on TBS – play-by-play (lead play-by-play 2010, 2012–2018), (regular season 2020–present)
2011–present: NCAA men's basketball tournament on CBS/TBS/TNT/TruTV – lead studio host

Personal life 

Johnson and his wife, Cheryl, a licensed professional counselor, live in Braselton, Georgia. The Johnsons have two biological children (Eric and Maggie) and four adopted children: a son named Michael, who was adopted from Romania, had Duchenne muscular dystrophy, and died in 2021; a daughter named Carmen, who was adopted from Paraguay; and daughters Ashley and Allison, adopted domestically through foster care.

Raised Catholic, Johnson now identifies as an evangelical and works on a regular basis with the Fellowship of Christian Athletes (FCA), Athletes in Action (AIA), and Samaritan's Feet.

Johnson is a devoted Atlanta Braves fan. Though he was born in Milwaukee, Johnson's family moved to the Atlanta area when he was nine, and he considers it to be his hometown. He attended high school at the private Marist School in nearby Brookhaven, Georgia.

On the November 10, 2016, edition of Inside the NBA, Johnson and co-hosts were discussing the 2016 U.S. presidential election and the stunning upset of Donald Trump's victory over Hillary Clinton. While giving his remarks, Johnson talked about the build-up to Election Day, and how he would lean on his Christian faith and pray for the transition of power and for the division in the country. He also revealed that he wrote in his vote for Ohio governor John Kasich, who was one of the 17 Republican candidates and the last to suspend his campaign.

In April 2017, he released his memoir, Unscripted: The Unpredictable Moments That Make Life Extraordinary.

Health 
In 2003, Johnson was diagnosed with non-Hodgkin's lymphoma, but continued his work through June 2006, when he began treatment. Due to his cancer, Johnson missed TNT's coverage of the British Open and PGA Championship, the last two golf major tournaments in 2006. Johnson returned to Inside the NBA on October 31, 2006, while continuing his chemotherapy treatments.

On October 1, 2018, Johnson announced that he would not be a part of the 2018 MLB postseason on TBS after being diagnosed with blood clots in both of his legs,  which affects his ability to travel by air.

Awards and honors 
Six-time Sports Emmy Award winner – Outstanding Sports Personality, Studio Host.
2021 National Sports Media Association National Sportscaster of the Year (with Scott Van Pelt)
Indiana Wesleyan University Society of World Changers 2019 Inductee, where he was presented with an honorary Doctorate of Humane Letters.

References 

1956 births
American evangelicals
American television sports announcers
American television talk show hosts
Association football commentators
Atlanta Braves announcers
College basketball announcers in the United States
College football announcers
Georgia Bulldogs baseball players
Golf writers and broadcasters
Living people
Major League Baseball broadcasters
Marist School (Georgia) alumni
National Basketball Association broadcasters
National Football League announcers
Olympic Games broadcasters
People from Atlanta
People from Milwaukee
Sports Emmy Award winners
Tennis commentators
University of Georgia alumni
Christians from Wisconsin